Racovitzia is a genus of marine ray-finned fish belonging to the family Bathydraconidae, the Antarctic dragonfishes. They are found in the Southern Ocean around Antarctica.

Taxonomy
Racovitzia was formally described as a genus in 1900 by the Belgian palaeontologist Louis Dollo when he was describing the only species in what was then considered to be a monotypic genus, Racovitzia glacialis the type of which had been collected by the Belgian Antarctic Expedition off the Antarctic at  71°23'S, 87°32'W or 71°19'S, 87°37'W. In 1916 Edgar Ravenswood Waite described Aconichthys harrisoni which has since been determined to be the second species in the genus, however some authorities consider that R harrisoni is a junior synonym of R. glacialis. The genus name honours the Romanian biologist Emil Racoviță who was the naturalist aboard the Belgica the ship which carried and supported the Belgian Antarctic Expedition.

Species
There are currently two recognized species in this genus:
 Racovitzia glacialis Dollo, 1900
 Racovitzia harrissoni (Waite, 1916)

Characteristics
Racovitzia has a slender elongated body which is only slightly compressed and has a long spatulate snout. The body is covered with small, ctenoid scales. There are three lateral lines which are made up of tubular scales. There is a strong ridge on the operculum which ends either in a rounded point or a small number of serrations. The jaws have band of small conical teeth.

Distribution habitat and biology
Racovitzia are found in the Southern Ocean with R. glacialis having a circum-Antarctic distribution on the continental shelf as well as around the South Sandwich Islands, South Orkney Islands, Elephant Island and South Shetland Islands. R. harrissoni is restricted to the southeastern Pacific Ocean off Chile. Their biology is little known but they have been recorded feeding on amphipods and krill, and they are probably largely dependant on krill. The presence of larvae in late November suggests that the eggs hatch in Spring.

References

Bathydraconidae
Fish of Antarctica
Taxa named by Louis Dollo